Dryad Press is an American small press and publisher.

History 
Dryad Press got its beginning in 1967 when Merrill Leffler and Neil Lehrman founded Dryad magazine. Leffler was a writer and editor and is currently the poet laureate of Takoma Park, Maryland. His work has been published in books, and in journals like the Jewish Book Council's Paper Brigade.  Lehrman was a partner in a CPA firm in addition to producing plays and poetry readings in San Francisco, where he lived.  Dryad was originally a quarterly, but as time went on the issues were published on a more irregular basis.  The magazine took its name from a line in the John Keats poem "Ode to a Nightingale."  In 1974, Dryad began to publish books, including issues of Dryad that were published as books, leading to the establishment of Dryad Press.  Dryad Press initially focused on poetry, but has since branched out to include both fiction and non-fiction.  Dryad Press specializes in works relating to Jewish subjects and works by authors connected to the state of Maryland.  Authors published by Dryad Press include Rod Jellema, Myra Sklarew, Herman Taube, and Paul Zimmer.  Dryad Press is based in Takoma Park, Maryland.

References 

Companies based in Maryland
Publishing companies established in 1967
Jewish printing and publishing
Book publishing companies based in Maryland